Vladas Jankauskas  (1923–1983) was a Lithuanian painter.

See also
List of Lithuanian painters

References
Universal Lithuanian Encyclopedia

1923 births
1983 deaths
20th-century Lithuanian painters